Jack McClelland (born 1951) is a poker tournament director and poker player who has had a career in poker operations for more than forty years. He was the WSOP tournament director in the 1980s, and was the tournament director of the Bellagio poker room from 2002 to 2013. In 2014, he was inducted into the Poker Hall of Fame.

McClelland retired in 2013 after the World Poker Tour Five Diamond event.

As of March 2020, his live tournament winnings exceed $375,000.

References

1951 births
American poker players
Poker tournament directors
American casino industry businesspeople
Living people
Poker Hall of Fame inductees